(" script") is the last widely used form of , the historical form of German handwriting that evolved alongside German blackletter (most notably ) typefaces. Graphic artist Ludwig Sütterlin was commissioned by the Prussian Ministry of Science, Art and Culture to create a modern handwriting script in 1911. His handwriting scheme gradually replaced the older cursive scripts that had developed in the 16th century at the same time that letters in books had developed into Fraktur. The name  is nowadays often used to refer to all varieties of old German handwriting, although only this specific script was taught in all German schools from 1915 to 1941.

History
The ministry had asked for "modern" handwriting scripts to be used in offices and to be taught in school. Sütterlin created two scripts in parallel with the two typefaces that were in use (see Antiqua–Fraktur dispute). The  scripts were introduced in Prussia in 1915, and from the 1920s onwards, it began to replace the relatively similar old German handwriting in schools. In 1935, the  style officially became the only German script taught in schools.

The Nazi Party banned all "broken" blackletter typefaces in 1941, which were seen as chaotic, including , and replaced them with Latin-type letters like Antiqua. However, many German-speakers who had been brought up with that writing system continued to use it well into the postwar period.

 continued to be taught in some German schools until the 1970s but no longer as the primary script.

Characteristics
The  lower-case 'e' contains two vertical bars close together, in which the origin of the umlaut diacritic (¨) from a small 'e' written above the modified vowel can be seen.

Because of their distinctiveness,  letters can be used on the blackboard for mathematical symbols, which would use  letters in print.

Overview of the letters 

(There are two lower case letters "s". The second one is used at the end of a syllable.)

A a
B b
C c
D d
E e
F f
G g
H h
I i
J j
K k
L l
M m
N n
O o
P p
Q q
R r
S ſ s
ß
T t
U u
V v
W w
X x
Y y
Z z
Ä ä
Ö ö
Ü ü

Examples

See also
 Antiqua–Fraktur dispute
 Blackletter
  (letter ß)
 
 
  handwriting

Notes

References

External links

 The  script at Omniglot
 German language page about  — with history of German cursive handwriting and Sütterlin
 Learn , a lesson, with sample texts
 Page where text typed is shown in 

Blackletter
Penmanship
Western calligraphy
German orthography